Knapp Cabin is a historic cabin located in Kings Canyon National Park, west of Cedar Grove, in Fresno County, California.

History
The one-room cabin was built in 1925 by George Owen Knapp, founder of Union Carbide. Knapp used the cabin for storage while camping in the area. After Knapp stopped camping in 1928, he no longer used the cabin.

The cabin saw occasional use until the creation of Kings Canyon National Park in 1940. In the 1950s, the National Park Service assumed maintenance of the cabin.

The Knapp Cabin was added to the National Register of Historic Places on December 20, 1978.

See also
National Register of Historic Places listings in Sequoia-Kings Canyon National Parks

References

External links

National Register of Historic Places in Kings Canyon National Park
Houses in Fresno County, California
Houses completed in 1925
Houses on the National Register of Historic Places in California
National Register of Historic Places in Fresno County, California